Kenneth Ray Smith (September 13, 1930 – February 4, 1999) was a chess player and author. He was a member of the Dallas Chess Club, and reached the rank of FIDE Master.

Smith founded Chess Digest in 1962. The Smith–Morra Gambit is named after him.

Smith was also a notable poker player, and came fourth in the 1981 World Series of Poker.

Books

King's Indian Attack, co-author John Hall, 2nd Revised Edition, Chess Digest, 
Modern Art of Attack, co-author John Hall, 1988, Chess Digest, 
An Unbeatable White Repertoire After 1 e4 e5 2 Nf3, co-author Larry Evans, 1988, Chess Digest, 
Winning with the Colle System, co-author John Hall, 1990, 2nd Revised Edition, Chess Digest, 
Winning with the Center Counter 1 e4 d5!, co-author John Hall, 1991, Chess Digest, 
2 c3 vs. The Sicilian and The Smith–Morra Gambit Declined, 1992, Chess Digest, 
Smith–Morra Accepted • A Game Collection, co-author Bill Wall, 1992, Chess Enterprises,  
Essential Chess Endings Explained Move By Move • Volume Two, 1992, Chess Digest, 
The Vienna Game and Gambit, co-author A. E. Santasiere, 1992, Revised 2nd Edition, 
Test Your Opening, Middlegame and Endgame Play, co-author Roy DeVault, 1992, Chess Digest, ASIN B000W028W6
Winning with the Pirc Defense, 1993, Chess Digest, 
Winning with the Reti Opening, co-author John Hall, 1993, Chess Digest, 
Winning with the Blackmar–Diemer Gambit, co-author John Hall, 1993, Chess Digest,  
The Veresov Attack, co-author John Hall, 1994, Chess Digest, 
The Göring Gambit • Accepted & Declined, co-author John Hall, 1994, Chess Digest, 
Winning With The Benko Gambit • Accepted, Semi-Accepted, Declined, co-author John Hall, 1994, Chess Digest,  
The Englund Gambit and The Blackburne–Hartlaub Gambit Complex, co-author John Hall, 1994, Chess Digest, 
Test Your Opening, Middlegame and Endgame Play • Volume II, co-author Roy DeVault, 1994, Chess Digest, ASIN B0087T145G  
Queen's Gambit Accepted, co-author John Hall, 1995, Chess Digest,  
The Catalan, co-author John Hall, 1995, Chess Digest, 
The Henning–Schara Gambit, co-author John Hall, 1995, Chess Digest, 
Grand Prix Attack • Attacking the Sicilian Defense with 2 f4, co-author John Hall, 1995, Revised 2nd Edition, Chess Digest,

References

1930 births
1999 deaths
American chess players
American chess writers
American poker players
Chess FIDE Masters
20th-century American non-fiction writers
20th-century American male writers
American male non-fiction writers
20th-century chess players